GBS may refer to:

People
 Guillermo Barros Schelotto, Argentine footballer and coach
 George Bernard Shaw, Irish playwright

Education

 Gandaki Boarding School, in Pokhara, Nepal
 Glenbrook South High School, in Glenview, Illinois, US
 Globsyn Business School, in Kolkata, India
 Goethe Business School, Frankfurt, Germany
 Gyeonggibuk Science High School, in Uijeongbu, South Korea

Medicine
 Glasgow-Blatchford score, a screening tool
 Group B streptococcus
 Guillain–Barré syndrome, a  muscle weakness

Technology
 Game Boy Sound System, a file format
 Geostationary balloon satellite
 Global Broadcast Service, a United States military communications network
 Gravity-based structure, a support structure
 IBM Global Business Services

Politics
 Gabungan Bersatu Sabah, a Sabah-based political parties coalition in Malaysia

Other uses
 Gbesi language
 Genotyping by sequencing
 Gifu Broadcasting System, in Japan
 Goals breakdown structure, a hierarchical structure
 Gold Bauhinia Star, an honour of Hong Kong
 Gram Bharati Samiti (Society for Rural Development), India
 Grundig Business Systems, a German company
 Gugun Blues Shelter, an Indonesian music group
 Guinea-Bissau at the Olympics, IOC code GBS
 Große Berliner Straßenbahn, later Berlin Straßenbahn